Bonn Egyptian Museum is an archaeological museum for ancient Egyptian antiquities located in Bonn, Germany. It presents a selection of the most important collection of original objects from Ancient Egypt in North Rhine-Westphalia.

The Bonn Egyptian Museum was founded in 2001. The collection is dating back to the 19th century and was formerly part of the Akademisches Kunstmuseum. Large parts of the collection were destroyed in World War II. Today the collection comprises about 3,000 objects.

The museum is part of the University of Bonn. Regular special events and children's excursions are held at the museum.

References

External links

  

University museums in Germany
Museums in Bonn
Egyptological collections in Germany
Archaeological museums in Germany
University of Bonn
Museums established in 2001
2001 establishments in Germany